Helle is a hamlet in the Dutch province of Limburg. It is located in the municipality of Gulpen-Wittem, about 1 km south of the village of Mechelen.

Helle is not a statistical entity, and the postal authorities have placed it under Mechelen. It has no place signs and consists about 10 houses.

References

Populated places in Limburg (Netherlands)
Gulpen-Wittem